The UWF Heavyweight Championship was the premier title in the Universal Wrestling Federation owned by Bill Watts. When Mid-South Wrestling Association changed its name to the UWF, the Mid-South North American Championship was retired and a tournament was held to crown a new UWF Heavyweight Champion. When Jim Crockett Promotions purchased the UWF, the title was defended in Crockett for a while and was then retired. 

It should not be confused with the UWF Heavyweight Championship that was defended in the Universal Wrestling Federation promotion owned by Herb Abrams. That title and promotion began several years after Watts' promotion was sold.

Title history

References

Universal Wrestling Federation (Bill Watts) championships
Heavyweight wrestling championships